Vernon Keenan may refer to:
 Vernon Keenan (law enforcement official)
 Vernon Keenan (coaster designer)